Daryl Clinton Smith is a former Major League Baseball pitcher. He pitched two games for the Kansas City Royals before continuing to pitch in the minor leagues again.

References

Sources

Major League Baseball pitchers
Kansas City Royals players
Gulf Coast Rangers players
Asheville Tourists players
Burlington Rangers players
Tulsa Drillers players
Salem Redbirds players
Waterloo Indians players
Waterbury Indians players
Williamsport Bills players
Reading Phillies players
Maine Guides players
Birmingham Barons players
Memphis Chicks players
Omaha Royals players
Bowie Baysox players
Columbus Clippers players
1960 births
Living people
African-American baseball players
Baseball players from Baltimore
Acereros de Monclova players
American expatriate baseball players in Mexico
American expatriate baseball players in Taiwan
Diablos Rojos del México players
Jungo Bears players
Saraperos de Saltillo players
Sinon Bulls players
American expatriate baseball players in Italy
21st-century African-American people
20th-century African-American sportspeople